Ageing & Society is a monthly peer-reviewed scientific journal covering gerontology from a sociological perspective. It was established in 1981 and is published by Cambridge University Press. The editor-in-chief is Christina R. Victor (Brunel University). According to the Journal Citation Reports, the journal has a 2017 impact factor of 1.62, ranking it 17th out of 36 journals in the category "Gerontology".

References

External links

Cambridge University Press academic journals
Publications established in 1981
Monthly journals
Gerontology journals
English-language journals
Sociology journals